Qallwa (Quechua for a little branch, also for an instrument out of wood or bones which the weavers use to press the threads of the cloth, Hispanicized spelling Jallhua) is a  mountain in the Andes of Peru. It is located in the Arequipa Region, Castilla Province, on the border of the districts of Ayo, Chachas and Choco. Its ridge extents from northeast to southwest. Qallwa lies southwest of Sirani and northeast of Sukna.

References

Mountains of Peru
Mountains of Arequipa Region